Riley Armstrong is the name of:

 Riley Armstrong (ice hockey) (born 1984), Canadian hockey player
 Riley Armstrong (musician) (born 1976), Canadian Christian singer and songwriter
 Riley Armstrong (album), the eponymously named music album by Riley Armstrong